Ibraheem Gul (born 12 April 1996) is a Pakistani cricketer who plays for Federally Administered Tribal Areas. He made his first-class debut on 16 November 2015 in the 2015–16 Quaid-e-Azam Trophy.

References

External links
 

1996 births
Living people
Pakistani cricketers
Federally Administered Tribal Areas cricketers
Place of birth missing (living people)